Solomon Yuryevich Kopelman (1880–1944) was a publisher in the Russian Empire.

He was the father of Socialist realist novelist Yury Krymov.

Brier
In 1906 Kopelman set up the Brier publishing house at 31 Nikolaevskaya Street, St Petersburg with Zinovii Isaevich Grzhebin. In 1918 they moved the publishing house to Moscow, and then shut it down in 1922, when he emigrated to Berlin.

References

1880 births
1944 deaths
Publishers (people) from the Russian Empire
Soviet emigrants to Germany